Door Gagan Ki Chhaon Mein is a 1964 Indian Hindi-language drama film directed, produced and written by Kishore Kumar. He also stars, along with Supriya Devi and Amit Kumar. Door Gagan Ki Chhaon Mein, an adaptation of the American film The Proud Rebel (1958), was released in 1964 and gained critical acclaim, but failed commercially. It was later remade in Tamil as Ramu (1966) in Telugu with that same title (1968), and in Malayalam as Babumon (1975).

Plot 

Shankar, a soldier, returns from war, only to find that his family has died in a fire, and the sole survivor is his infant son Ramu, left mute by the incident. When Shankar is attacked by the Thakur's men, he is rescued by a woman named Meera, and they fall in love. This provokes further trouble from the Thakur whose son wants to marry Meera.

Cast 
 Kishore Kumar as Shankar
 Supriya Devi as Meera
Amit Kumar as Ramu

Production 
Door Gagan Ki Chhaon Mein was the directorial debut of Kishore Kumar, who also worked as producer, writer and lead actor. The film was based on the 1958 American film The Proud Rebel directed by Michael Curtiz. Kumar also took inspiration from the 1955 Bengali film Pather Panchali, which he saw at least 13 times before making Door Gagan Ki Chhaon Mein. Although Kumar was then known primarily for acting in comedy films, he cast himself against type this time by portraying the melancholic role of Shankar, a demobbed soldier. Regarding his choice to make such a melancholic film, Kumar said, "There's sadness in the heart of even a comedian." His son Amit played the role of Shankar's son Ramu, and Supriya Devi portrayed Meera, the woman Shankar falls in love with after she rescues him from an attack. Devi said she accepted to work on the film because of its offbeat nature. Aloke Dasgupta was the cinematographer, and Ramesh Pant wrote the dialogue. According to Amit, his father's fascination for the word "door" (meaning far) was the reason behind the film receiving its title. He also said that, despite Kumar facing adverse remarks from his friends while making the film, he managed to complete it "against all odds".

Soundtrack 
The soundtrack was composed by Kishore Kumar who also worked as lyricist, along with Shailendra. The song "Aa Chalke Tujhe", written by the former, attained popularity. R. D. Burman played the harmonica.

Release and reception 
Door Gagan Ki Chhaon Mein was released in 1964, and received critical acclaim. Baburao Patel, then the editor of Filmindia magazine, wrote, "Door Gagan Ki Chhaon Mein just misses out on being a classic". However, it was not commercially successful. When officials suggested that Kumar give them bribes so that the film would be entered for the National Film Awards, Kumar refused.

Remakes 
Door Gagan Ki Chhaon Mein was remade in Tamil as Ramu (1966). The remake was commercially successful, and won the National Film Award for Best Feature Film in Tamil. Kishore Kumar's brother Ashok Kumar praised Ramu screenwriter Javar Seetharaman for making suitable changes to the screenplay. The film was also remade in Telugu with that same title in 1968, and in Malayalam as Babumon (1975).

References

Bibliography

External links 
 

1960s Hindi-language films
1964 directorial debut films
1964 drama films
1964 films
Films directed by Kishore Kumar
Hindi films remade in other languages
Indian drama films
Indian remakes of American films